The RA-14 Loisirs was a French two-seat high-wing light touring aircraft designed by Roger Adam shortly after World War II.

Design and production
The Loisirs ("Leisure") was designed in May 1945 by Roger Adam and built by Etablissements Aeronautiques R. Adam. It was a tube, wood and fabric two-seater suitable for amateur construction. It was a high-wing braced monoplane with a fixed tail-wheel undercarriage. The seats were positioned side-by-side.

These included the Régnier 4D, Continental A65, Continental A75 and Continental C90 engines.

Variants
The design rights were sold in 1957 to the Maranda Aircraft Company of Canada who sold plans for amateur construction of the RA14BM1 Loisirs as the Falconar AMF-S14. More than 30 examples were built in North America.

Adam RA-14 Loisirs

Falconar AMF-S14
Homebuilt variant
RA-14 SL "Super Loisirs"
modified wing and tail with trim tabs

Survivors
Of the French production of 40 Loisirs, 17 were active in 1965 and five were still flying in the country in 2001.

Specifications

References

Notes

Bibliography

Single-engined tractor aircraft
High-wing aircraft
1940s French civil utility aircraft
Homebuilt aircraft
RA-14
Maranda aircraft
Aircraft first flown in 1948